The 1990–91 FIBA European Champions Cup was the 34th season of the European top-tier level professional FIBA European Champions Cup (now called EuroLeague). It was won by POP 84, after they beat FC Barcelona Banca Catalana 70–65. It was their second championship triumph over the Spanish team, and their third straight championship overall. A feat previously achieved only by Rīgas ASK, who won the first three editions of the trophy. The culminating 1991 FIBA European Champions Cup Final Four was held at Palais Omnisports de Paris-Bercy, Bercy, Paris, on 16–18 April 1991. Toni Kukoč was named Final Four MVP for the second straight year.

This season of the competition also marked an end to the era of European national domestic league champions only participation, as the next season featured an expanded competition, that included national domestic league champions, the current league title holders, and some other teams from the most important national domestic leagues. That also was in accordance with the league being renamed for the next season, and being called the FIBA European League (or shortened to FIBA EuroLeague) championship for men's clubs. A name the competition would keep for the next five editions of the competition.

Competition system

27 teams (European national domestic league champions only), playing in a tournament system, played knock-out rounds on a home and away basis. The aggregate score of both games decided the winner.
The eight remaining teams after the knock-out rounds entered a 1/4 Final Group Stage, which was played as a round-robin. The final standing was based on individual wins and defeats. In the case of a tie between two or more teams after the group stage, the following criteria were used to decide the final classification: 1) number of wins in one-to-one games between the teams; 2) basket average between the teams; 3) general basket average within the group.
The top four teams after the 1/4 Final Group Stage qualified for the Final Stage (Final Four), which was played at a predetermined venue.

First round

|}

Round of 16

|}

Quarterfinal round

Final four

Semifinals
April 16, Palais Omnisports de Paris-Bercy, Paris

|}

3rd place game
April 18, Palais Omnisports de Paris-Bercy, Paris

|}

Final
April 18, Palais Omnisports de Paris-Bercy, Paris

|}

Final standings

Awards

FIBA European Champions Cup Final Four MVP
 Toni Kukoč ( POP 84)

FIBA European Champions Cup Finals Top Scorer
 Zoran Savić ( POP 84)

FIBA European Champions Cup All-Final Four Team

References

External links
1990–91 FIBA European Champions Cup
1990–91 FIBA European Champions Cup
Champions Cup 1990–91 Line-ups and Stats

FIBA
EuroLeague seasons